The Lancia Dilambda is a passenger car produced by Lancia between 1928 and 1935. The car was officially presented in Paris Motor Show in 1929. The car has 4 litre V8 engine with 24 degree V angle.

Three versions of the Dilambda were built:

 First series, produced between 1928 and 1931, total 1,104 built.
 Second series, produced between 1931 and 1933, total 300 built. Modified gearbox and brakes.
 Third series, produced between 1933 and 1935, total 281 built. Modified chassis for more aerodynamic style, it was built only with long wheelbase.

References 
Lancia by Michael Frostick, 1976.

External links

 1932 Lancia Dilambda History, Pictures, Value, Auction Sales, Research and News
 Lancia 1930 Dilambda - Museo Nicolis

Dilambda
Cars introduced in 1928
1930s cars